Joan Calucho (born 25 June 1925) is a Spanish former cyclist, who was professional between 1945 and 1959. In 1945, Joan Calucho turned professional with the AC Montjuïc team. His first victory was at the Volta a Lleida that season, which he won again three years later.

Biography
Joan Calucho was born in Lleida, Catalonia on June 25, 1925. His brother Jaume Calucho Mestres was also a professional cyclist. In 1955, Calucho competed in the Vuelta a España. After UC Terrassa announced 1954 would be its final season in professional cycling, he moved to Mobylette for the 1955 season. Calucho retired in 1959.

Major results
1945
1st Volta a Lleida
1948
1st Volta a Lleida
1950
1st Circuit Ribera del Jalón

Vuelta a España results 
 1955

References

External links
 Joan Calucho Mestres on sitiodeciclismo.net

1925 births
Living people
Spanish male cyclists
Sportspeople from Lleida
Cyclists from Catalonia
20th-century Spanish people